The 2012 West Oxfordshire District Council election took place on 3 May 2012 to elect members of West Oxfordshire District Council in Oxfordshire, England. One third of the council was up for election and the Conservative Party stayed in overall control of the council.

After the election, the composition of the council was:
Conservative 41
Labour 4
Liberal Democrats 4

Background
After the last election in 2011 the Conservatives controlled the council with 44 councillors, while the Liberal Democrats had four seats and Labour had one seat. 17 seats were contested in 2012, with the Conservative Party having a full 17 candidates, while Labour had 13, the Liberal Democrats 10 and the Green Party had nine candidates.

Election result
The Conservatives lost three seats to Labour, but remained in control of the council with 41 councillors. The three Labour gains came in the wards of Chipping Norton, Witney Central and Witney East, taking the party to four seats on the council. This was level with the Liberal Democrats, who remained on four seats, but Liberal Democrat Elizabeth Poskitt did defeat the new Conservative leader of Oxfordshire County Council, Ian Hudspeth, in Woodstock and Bladon by 65 votes. The three Labour gains came in wards with no Liberal Democrat or Green candidates, while the Liberal Democrat gain came in a ward with no Labour or Green candidates, although the parties denied there had been any arrangement. Overall eight of the 11 councillors who stood were re-elected, while average turnout at the election was 34.77%.

Ward results

By-elections between 2012 and 2014

Carterton South
A by-election was held in Carterton South on 2 May 2013 after the resignation of Conservative councillor Joe Walcott. The seat was held for the Conservatives by Lynn Little with a majority of 369 votes over Labour candidate Dave Wesson.

Witney East
A by-election was held in Witney East on 2 May 2013 after the resignation of Conservative councillor Sian Davies. The seat was held for the Conservatives by Jeanette Baker with a majority of 152 votes over Labour candidate Alfred Fullah.

Chipping Norton
A by-election was held in Chipping Norton on 7 November 2013 after the death of Labour councillor Rob Evans. The seat was held for Labour by Geoff Saul with a majority of 310 votes over Conservative candidate Joe Johnson.

References

2012 English local elections
2012
2010s in Oxfordshire